Jan Turner can refer to:

 Jan Turner (runner), Bermudian runner
 Jan Turner (swimmer) (born 1944), Australian Olympic swimmer